The Sölvesborg Ladies Open was a women's professional golf tournament on the Swedish Golf Tour played between 1995 and 2018. It was included on the LET Access Series from 2013 to 2016. It was always held at Sölvesborg Golf Club in Sölvesborg, Sweden, except in 2016 when it was hosted at nearby Elisefarm Golf Club in Hörby.

Winners

References

LET Access Series events
Swedish Golf Tour (women) events
Golf tournaments in Sweden
Defunct sports competitions in Sweden
Recurring sporting events established in 1995
Recurring sporting events disestablished in 2018